Mjølkedalstinden is a mountain south of Rauddalen in Luster municipality in Vestland. It has an altitude of 2,138 meters above sea level. It is easily climbed from the ridge from the north-west.

References

Mountains of Vestland